Royston Varley (born 27 January 1952) is a British alpine skier. He competed in three events at the 1972 Winter Olympics.

References

1952 births
Living people
British male alpine skiers
Olympic alpine skiers of Great Britain
Alpine skiers at the 1972 Winter Olympics
Place of birth missing (living people)